Capilano Mall is a  shopping mall in the City of North Vancouver in British Columbia, Canada. It is located on Marine Drive, near the city's western border with the District of North Vancouver. It is the second largest shopping mall in the north shore, after Park Royal.

The anchor tenant is Walmart.

History
Capilano Mall was originally built in 1967. Woolworth's then Woolco and Super-Valu were the initial anchor tenants. In 1974 an expansion added a Sears store. The mall underwent an upgrade and major expansion in 1986, and again in 2001. Also within the mall, there is also a set of two totem poles which were erected in 1986 and serves as a center piece icon in relations to its history and ties to local land.

Transportation
Capilano Mall is served by frequent TransLink bus service along Marine Drive.

Shop and Services 
In addition to Walmart, shops include Urban Planet, Claire's, Dollar Tree, and Showcase. Food chains include A&W, Cobs Bread, and Subway.

See also
Park Royal Shopping Centre
Lonsdale Quay
List of shopping malls in Canada

References

External links
Capilano Mall

North Vancouver (city)
Shopping malls in Metro Vancouver
Shopping malls established in 1967